José-Junior Matuwila (born 20 September 1991) is a professional footballer who plays as a centre back for FC 08 Homburg. Born in Germany, Matuwila represents the Angola national team.

International career
On 22 September 2020, Matuwila was called-up by the senior Angola national football team. Matuwila debuted or Angola in a 3-0 friendly win over Mozambique on 23 October 2020.

References

External links
 
 Profile at kicker.de

1991 births
Sportspeople from Bonn
Footballers from North Rhine-Westphalia
German people of Angolan descent
Living people
Angolan footballers
Angola international footballers
German footballers
Association football defenders
TuS Koblenz players
TuS Mayen players
FC Energie Cottbus players
1. FC Kaiserslautern players
Rot-Weiss Essen players
Atlético Petróleos de Luanda players
FC 08 Homburg players
3. Liga players
Regionalliga players
Girabola players